Club de Regatas Lima (CRL) (Spanish for Lima Regatta Club) is a sports club in Lima, Peru, one of the oldest sport clubs in South America and the biggest sports club in Peru.

History
The Club de Regatas Lima was founded in 1875 as a rowing club.

Description
Regatas lima manages sport teams in multiple sports, including: rowing, sailing, football (soccer), basketball, swimming, and others.

It has five venues: La Punta (where the rowing team trains and sleeps), La Cantuta (park with entertainment infrastructure), Villa, San Antonio (beach venue).

Departments

Football (Soccer)

Honours
Play in the Copa Perú which is the third division of the Peruvian league.
 Liga Distrital de San Isidro:
Winners (10): 1968, 2000, 2003, 2004, 2005, 2010, 2013, 2014, 2019, 2022
Runner-up (45): 1960, 1961, 1962, 1963, 1964, 1965, 1966, 1967, 1969-1999, 2001, 2002, 2006, 2007, 2008, 2009

Basketball

The club traditionally provides Peru's national basketball team with most of its key players.

Honours
 Peruvian League:
Winners (5): 2002, 2003, 2011, 2015, 2016

Volleyball
 Liga Nacional Superior de Voleibol:
Winners (6): 2002, 2004–05, 2005–06, 2006–07, 2016–17, 2020–21
Runner-up (3): 2007–08, 2009–10, 2015–16

See also
List of football clubs in Peru
Peruvian football league system
Club's website:

References

 Video Pista Atletica de Villa Deportiva

Football clubs in Lima
Association football clubs established in 1875
Sport in Lima
Basketball teams in Peru
Yacht clubs in Peru
1875 establishments in Peru